James W. Payne (November 11, 1929 – August 12, 1992) was an American set decorator. He won an Academy Award and was nominated for two more in the category Best Art Direction.

Selected filmography
Payne won an Academy Award for Best Art Direction and was nominated for two more:
Won
 The Sting (1973)
Nominated
 Come Blow Your Horn (1963)
 The Oscar (1966)

References

External links

American set decorators
Best Art Direction Academy Award winners
Artists from Ogden, Utah
1929 births
1992 deaths